Rob Thompson may refer to:

 Rob Thompson (director),  American television director, producer and screenwriter
 Rob Thompson (rugby union), New Zealand rugby union player

See also
 Rob Thomson, baseball player and coach
 Robert Thompson (disambiguation)